William Roark Ratliff (born August 16, 1936), is an American politician and engineer who served as a member of the Texas Senate from 1988 to 2004. Between 2000 and 2003 he served as the 40th lieutenant governor of Texas, after previous Lieutenant Governor Rick Perry replaced George W. Bush, who resigned to become president of the United States.

Early life and education
Ratliff was educated at Sonora High School in Sonora in Sutton County in West Texas and then at the University of Texas at Austin, where he studied civil engineering. Ratliff, along with brothers Shannon and Jack, was a member of the Phi Gamma Delta fraternity.

Career 
Ratliff worked as a civil engineer for thirty years.

Texas Senate 
He was first elected in 1988 as a Republican to the Texas Senate. In 1992, he was appointed chairman of the Senate Education Committee by Lieutenant Governor Bob Bullock. From 1997 to 1998, he served as President Pro Tempore of the Texas Senate.

Ratliff and his wife, the former Sally Sandlin, have three children and eight grandchildren. Son Bennett Ratliff of Coppell, a civil engineer, served nine years as a Coppell ISD School Board Trustee and was elected in 2012 to represent District 115 in the Texas House of Representatives. Another son, Robert Thomas Ratliff (born 1967) of Mt. Pleasant, is the Republican Vice-Chairman of the Texas State Board of Education.

Ratliff announced in 2003 that he would not run for reelection to the State Senate in 2004. Instead he soon resigned the Senate seat and was succeeded in a special election by Republican Kevin Eltife of Tyler. In 2005, Ratliff was awarded the John F. Kennedy Profile in Courage Award for "the example he has set of courage and principle in American public life".

Lieutenant governor
In 2000, for the first time in Texas history, the Texas Senate was called upon to choose a new lieutenant governor after the election of George W. Bush as President of the United States and the resultant succession of lieutenant governor Rick Perry to become governor. In accordance with a 1984 amendment to the Texas Constitution of 1876, the Texas Senate chooses one of its own members to fill a vacancy in the position of lieutenant governor.

In the election for lieutenant governor, Ratliff defeated rival David Sibley of Waco. In 2001, Ratliff first announced that he would be a candidate for election to a full four-year term to the office of lieutenant governor in the 2002 state elections, and he received the endorsement of several prominent Republican legislators. However, he later withdrew from the race, and the position went to David Dewhurst, the Texas land commissioner.

Political views
Ratliff is regarded as a moderate. He stated in an interview, "I am a Republican because I agree with the Republicans at least 51 percent of the time." He has taken bipartisan stands on a number of issues. While in the Texas Senate, he supported controversial reforms that transferred funds from richer to poorer school districts for more equitable funding. He also argued in favor of "patients' rights" in medical malpractice cases during a debate on tort reform, and in 2003 criticized other members of the State Senate for failing to raise taxes in order to prevent large budget cuts.

In early 2003, Ratliff was the only dissenting member of his party who joined with Democratic state senators in opposing a redistricting proposal of Texas's then thirty-two seats in the United States House of Representatives that he felt would lead to the under-representation of rural voters. In cooperation with ten Democrats, he signed a letter refusing to bring the matter to the Senate floor, which, by virtue of Texas Senate traditions that require a two-thirds vote of those present and voting to allow a bill to be debated, prevented the proposal from being passed.

Eventually a plan suitable to Republicans was enacted in the third of three special legislative sessions called in 2003 by Governor Perry. Under that plan, by 2011, Republicans held twenty-three U.S. House seats from Texas compared to nine for Democrats.

References

External links

1936 births
Living people
21st-century American engineers
Lieutenant Governors of Texas
Republican Party Texas state senators
Cockrell School of Engineering alumni
People from Sutton County, Texas
People from Mount Pleasant, Texas
21st-century American politicians